Gandheswari (IAST: Gandēśvarī;) is a goddess worshiped by Gandhabanik community, is an incarnation of Goddess Durga She is worshiped during Baishaki Purnima by Gandhabanik community. It has been said that she saved Gandhabati from Gandhasura. She has four arms and is seen seated on a lion. Gandhabanik community worships her for their development in their business.

References

 Durga temples
 Merchant castes
 Hindu goddesses
 Consorts of Shiva
 Perfumers